Bulle Rock Golf Course is a golf course in the eastern United States, located in Havre de Grace, Maryland. It is named for Bulle Rock, the first thoroughbred racehorse brought to America. It hosted the LPGA Championship, a women's major, from 2005 through 2009.

Bulle Rock was designed by noted course architect Pete Dye and opened  in 1998. In 2002, Manekin, LLC, Clark Turner, and H&S Properties Development Corporation purchased the golf course and surrounding land and properties from original owner, Ed Abel. The golf course has consistently won awards.

References

External links

The Dapper Drive – Bulle Rock Golf Course

Golf clubs and courses in Maryland
Buildings and structures in Havre de Grace, Maryland
1998 establishments in Maryland
Tourist attractions in Harford County, Maryland